David Paul Arnold (born November 21, 1966) is a former American football player.  He played college football as a defensive back for the University of Michigan from 1985 to 1988.  He played professional football in the National Football League (NFL) for the Pittsburgh Steelers during the 1989 NFL season.

Early years
Arnold was born in Warren, Ohio, in 1966. He attended Warren G. Harding High School in Warren, Ohio.

University of Michigan
Arnold enrolled at the University of Michigan in 1985 and played college football as a defensive back for head coach Bo Schembechler's Michigan Wolverines football teams from 1985 to 1988. He started two games at cornerback in 1986, nine games in 1987, and 10 games in 1988.  He was selected by conference coaches as a first-team defensive back on the 1988 All-Big Ten Conference football team. In four years at Michigan, he recorded 105 tackles, 15 pass breakups, five interceptions, and three fumble recoveries.

Professional football
Arnold was selected by the Pittsburgh Steelers in the fifth round (118th overall pick) of the 1989 NFL Draft. He appeared in 15 games, none as a starter, for the Steelers during the 1989 NFL season. In February 1990, Arnold was taken from the Steelers by the Houston Oilers pursuant to Plan B free agency.  Arnold signed a three-year contract with the Oilers, but he did not appear in any games for the Oilers.

References

1966 births
Living people
Sportspeople from Warren, Ohio
Players of American football from Ohio
American football defensive backs
Pittsburgh Steelers players
Michigan Wolverines football players